It Happened One Night 6.28 is a live album by Holly Cole. Originally released in Canada in 1996 on Alert Records, it was also released in 1996 on the Metro Blue imprint of Capitol Records.  It was recorded on June 28, 1995 at the St. Denis Theatre in Montreal, PQ and was originally released as an Enhanced CD including QuickTime video content playable on both Mac and Windows.

Track listing

 "Get Out of Town" (Porter) – 5:15
 "Cry (If You Want To)" (Scott) – 3:15
 "Train Song" (Tom Waits) – 3:31
 "Losing My Mind" (Sondheim) – 5:48
 "Tango 'Til They're Sore" (Tom Waits) – 5:00
 "Don't Let the Teardrops Rust Your Shining Heart" (Watt) – 5:01
 "Que Sera, Sera (Whatever Will Be, Will Be)" (Evans, Livingston) – 5:43
 "Calling You" (Telson) – 5:29

Enhanced CD Content

The Enhanced CD portion consisted of an interactive media presentation including pictures, audio and video interviews, music videos. and live performance video recordings.

Music Videos:
 "Calling You"
 "I Can See Clearly Now"

Live Performance:
 "Cry (If You Want To)"
 "Little By Blue"
 "Que Sera, Sera"
 "Train Song"

Personnel

 Vocals: Holly Cole
 Piano: Aaron Davis
 Bass: David Piltch
 Guitar: Kevin Breit
 Drums & Percussion: Dougie Bowne

References

Holly Cole albums
1996 live albums
Capitol Records live albums